Statistics of Ekstraklasa for the 1964–65 season.

Overview
14 teams played in the league and the championship went to Górnik Zabrze.

League table

Results

Top goalscorers

References
 Poland – List of final tables at RSSSF 

Ekstraklasa seasons
1964–65 in Polish football
Pol